The Mark 11 nuclear bomb was an American nuclear bomb developed from the earlier Mark 8 nuclear bomb in the mid-1950s.  Like the Mark 8, the Mark 11 was an earth-penetrating weapon, also known as a nuclear bunker buster bomb.

Description 
As with the Mark 8, the Mark 11 was a gun-type nuclear bomb (see also: gun-type assembly weapon).  It used a fixed large target assembly of highly enriched uranium or HEU, a gun-like barrel, and a powder charge and uranium bullet or projectile fired up the barrel into the target.

The Mark 11 was first produced in 1956, and was in service until 1960. A total of 40 were produced, replacing but not expanding the quantity of Mark 8 bombs. Yield was reportedly the same as the Mark 8, 25 to 30 kilotons.

The two bombs reportedly used the same basic fissile weapon design, but the Mark 11 had a much more modern external casing designed to penetrate further and more reliably into the ground.  The Mark 8 had a flat nose, much like a torpedo.  The Mark 11 nose was a pointed ogive shape.
The MK-11 also known as the MK-91 had variable yields by changing the target rings. A major difference over the MK-8 was that the MK-91 had an electric operated actuator as a safety device that would rotate a spline ring to prevent the projectile from being fired into the target rings. The MK-8 had no safety devices. Upon release from the delivery aircraft detonation would occur after the black powder fuzes burned 90-110 seconds. The MK-91 was a deep penetrating weapon in many surface materials. A "PHOEBE" polonium initiator increased the nuclear detonation efficiency.

See also 
 List of nuclear weapons
 Mark 8 nuclear bomb
 Mark 1 Little Boy nuclear bomb

External links 
 Allbombs.html list of all US nuclear warheads at nuclearweaponarchive.org

Cold War aerial bombs of the United States
Gun-type nuclear bombs
Nuclear bombs of the United States
Military equipment introduced in the 1950s